WINF-LP (98.5 FM) is a radio station licensed to Delaware, Ohio, airing an easy listening format. The station is owned by Delaware County Development Company.

References

External links
WINF-LP's official website

Easy listening radio stations
INF-LP
Radio stations established in 2003
2003 establishments in Ohio